Laguna del Inca is a lake in Valparaíso Region, Chile, close to the border with Argentina. Portillo ski resort is located at the southern end of the lake, near Chile Route 60.

The stream that drains the lake is a tributary of the Juncalillo River, which flows into the Juncal River.

References

Lakes of Chile
Lakes of Valparaíso Region